The 1991 Ogun State gubernatorial election occurred on December 14, 1991. SDP candidate Olusegun Osoba won the election.

Conduct
The gubernatorial election was conducted using an open ballot system. Primaries for the two parties to select their flag bearers were conducted on October 19, 1991.

The election occurred on December 14, 1991. SDP candidate Olusegun Osoba won the election.

References 

Ogun State gubernatorial elections
December 1991 events in Nigeria
Ogu